Jürgen Prutsch (born September 22, 1989 in Graz) is an Austrian professional football player. Currently, he plays for Italian Lega Pro Prima Divisione side Barletta on loan from A.S. Livorno Calcio.

He made his Serie A debut for A.S. Livorno Calcio on March 24, 2010 in a game against F.C. Internazionale Milano.

References

1989 births
Living people
Austrian footballers
Grazer AK players
SK Sturm Graz players
SC Rheindorf Altach players
Austrian expatriate footballers
Expatriate footballers in Italy
Serie A players
Serie B players
U.S. Livorno 1915 players
A.S.D. Barletta 1922 players

Association football midfielders